Granby Memorial High School is a public high school in Granby, Connecticut. It was founded in 1957 to accommodate the town's growing population. The school is commonly known as "Home of the Bears" and is a member of the NCCC Athletic Conference, where its athletic teams have won a number of championships. The high school's current principal is Mike Dunn.  One of the high school's former principals, Jordan Grossman, is currently the district's superintendent. The school is located less than one half mile north of the center of Granby on Route 10 and 202.

Academic achievements 

The school was recognized in 2006 as a Connecticut Vanguard School as a result of its excellent academic performance on the Connecticut Academic Performance Test and other criteria.

In 2008 Connecticut Magazine ranked Granby Memorial High School 14th out of public 125 Connecticut schools. The rankings were mainly based on the schools' student academic performance.

For 2010, based on 2007/2008 statistics, GMHS was ranked #4 in Top Schools for Hartford County by Hartford Magazine.

Sports teams

Fall 

 Cross Country (Boys & Girls)
 Field Hockey (Girls) State Championship 2019
 Football (Boys & Girls)
 Soccer (Boys & Girls) - Boys State Championship in 2006, Girls State Championship 2017 & 2019
 Volleyball (Girls) State Championship 2015

Winter 

 Basketball (Boys & Girls) - a team that recently earned a Class S state champion title in 2013 and were runner ups in 2018 and 2022.
 Ice Hockey (Boys)
 Wrestling (Boys)
 Swimming (Boys & Girls)
 Indoor Track (Boys & Girls)
Cheerleading (Boys & Girls)

Spring 

 Baseball (Boys)
 Softball (Girls)
 Golf (Boys & Girls) The Granby boys golf team were runner up state champions in 2010.
 Tennis (Boys & Girls)
 Lacrosse (Boys & Girls)
 Track (Boys & Girls)
 Ultimate Frisbee (Boys & Girls) Qualified for states both of the first two years the program was running

Clubs and organizations 
GMHS offers a variety of clubs and organizations: AFS Club, Artemis Club, Best Buddies International, Chamber Singers, Chess Club, Computer Club, Connecticut Youth Forum, Debate Society, Drama Club, Environmental Club, French Exchange, French Honor Society, Horticulture Club, Leo Club, Math League, National Honor Society, Peer Mediators, Poetry Club, Robotics Club, SAFE (GSA), Spanish Honor Society, DECA Club, Student Government, Weightlifting Club, and Young Educators Society (YES).

The robotics club in Granby is a FIRST Robotics Competition (FRC) team, team 3146. While not a sport, the club is considered a varsity team.

References

External links
 

Schools in Hartford County, Connecticut
Granby, Connecticut
Public high schools in Connecticut
1957 establishments in Connecticut
Educational institutions established in 1957